The sack of Sandomierz  during the first Mongol invasion of Poland took place on 13 February 1241. It ended in the victory of the Mongol forces, who captured the city and burned it, massacring the residents.

During the Mongol invasion of Poland, southeastern Polish city of Sandomierz was regarded by the invaders as a strategically important location, which had to be captured. Sandomierz lies near the confluence of the Vistula and the San rivers, near the 13th-century border between the Kingdom of Poland and Mongol-controlled Red Ruthenia. 

The invaders captured Sandomierz on 13 February 1241, after crossing the frozen Vistula. According to Jan Długosz, forces of the khan besieged both the city, and the castle. After breaking defences, they murdered the Abbot of Koprzywnica, and all monks from Koprzywnica's Abbey, who had fled to the city. A great number of residents of the area was massacred, and the invaders saved only young men, whom they enslaved. 

During the siege, the Mongols used specially designed engines, especially stone throwing machines, which threw rocks weighing over 100 kilograms. The city was captured after four days, and after the sack, Mongol forces headed westwards, to Wiślica and Skalbmierz. On the day of the capture of Sandomierz, the Battle of Tursko took place. 

In 1259–1260, the Mongols sieged and captured Sandomierz again, razing the city and massacring its residents.

See also
Sacking of Sandomierz (1260)

Sources 
 Tomislaw Giergiel, Tatarzy w Sandomierzu
 Piastowie. Leksykon biograficzny, wyd. 1999, str. 397
 Wielka Historia Polski cz. do 1320, wyd. Pinexx 1999, s. 187-188
 Stanislaw Krakowski, Polska w walce z najazdami tatarskimi w XIII wieku, wyd. MON 1956, str. 136-137

Conflicts in 1241
1241 in Europe
Sandomierz (1241)
Poland

Sandomierz 1241
Razed cities